The external carotid artery is a major artery of the head and neck.  It arises from the common carotid artery when it splits into the external and internal carotid artery. External carotid artery supplies blood to the face and neck.

Structure
The external carotid artery begins at the upper border of thyroid cartilage, and curves, passing forward and upward, and then inclining backward to the space behind the neck of the mandible, where it divides into the superficial temporal and maxillary artery within the parotid gland.

It rapidly diminishes in size as it travels up the neck, owing to the number and large size of its branches.

At its origin, this artery is closer to the skin and more medial than the internal carotid, and is situated within the carotid triangle.

Development
In children, the external carotid artery is somewhat smaller than the internal carotid; but in the adult, the two vessels are of nearly equal size.

Relations 
At the origin, external carotid artery is more medial than internal carotid artery. When external carotid artery ascends the neck, it lies more lateral than internal carotid artery.

The external carotid artery is covered by the skin, superficial fascia, platysma muscle, deep fascia, and anterior margin of the sternocleidomastoid; it is crossed by the hypoglossal nerve, by the lingual, ranine, common facial, and superior thyroid veins; and by the digastricus and stylohyoideus muscles; higher up it passes deeply into the substance of the parotid gland, where it lies deep to the facial nerve and the junction of the temporal and internal maxillary veins.

Medial to it are the hyoid bone, the wall of the pharynx, the superior laryngeal nerve, and a portion of the parotid gland.

Posterior to it, near its origin, is the superior laryngeal nerve; and higher up, it is separated from the internal carotid by the styloglossus and stylopharyngeus muscles, the glossopharyngeal nerve, the pharyngeal branch of the vagus, and part of the parotid gland.

Branches

As the artery travels upwards, it gives the following branches:
 In the carotid triangle:
 Superior thyroid artery, arising from its anterior aspect
 Ascending pharyngeal artery - arising from medial, or deep, aspect
 Lingual artery - arising from its anterior aspect
 Facial artery - arise from its anterior aspect
 Occipital artery - arising from its posterior aspect
 Posterior auricular artery - arising from posterior aspect

The external carotid artery terminates as two branches:
 Maxillary artery
 Superficial temporal artery

Anastomoses
The superior thyroid artery anastomoses with inferior thyroid artery, where the latter arises from thyrocervical trunk of the subclavian artery.

Terminal branch of facial artery anastomose with ophthalmic artery of internal carotid artery.

Posterior auricular artery anastomose with occipital artery, another branch of external carotid artery.

One of the branches of superficial temporal artery anastomose with lacrimal and palpebral branches of ophthalmic artery.

Additional images

References

External links

 
 
 Diagram at umich.edu

Arteries of the head and neck